Oligotomidae is a family of webspinners in the order Embioptera. There are about 6 genera and at least 40 described species in Oligotomidae.

They are known to be found in warmer regions of the Old World and in the Southwestern United States.

Genera
These six genera belong to the family Oligotomidae:
 Aposthonia Krauss, 1911
   Aposthonia ceylonica, native to South-East Asia, found to be present in the UK in 2019.
 Bulbosembia, Ross, 2007
 Eosembia, Ross, 2007
 Haploembia Verhoeff, 1904
 Lobosembia, Ross, 2007
 Oligotoma Westwood, 1837

References

Further reading

External links

 

 
Embioptera
Insect families